The knockout stage of the 2013 Africa Cup of Nations ran from 2 February, and ended with the final on 10 February. The matches were held in the South African cities of Port Elizabeth, Durban, Rustenburg, Nelspruit, and Johannesburg.

Qualified teams
The top two placed teams from each of the four groups advanced to the knockout stage.

Bracket

All times are South African Standard Time (UTC+2)

Quarter-finals

Ghana vs. Cape Verde

South Africa vs. Mali

Ivory Coast vs. Nigeria

Burkina Faso vs. Togo

Semi-finals

Mali vs. Nigeria

Burkina Faso vs. Ghana

Third place play-off

Final

References

External links
Official website

2013 Africa Cup of Nations